Laura Wilson Barker (6 March 1819 – 22 May 1905), was a composer, performer and artist, sometimes also referred to as Laura Barker, Laura W Taylor or "Mrs Tom Taylor".

Career
She was born in Thirkleby, North Yorkshire, third daughter of a clergyman, the Rev. Thomas Barker. She studied privately with Cipriani Potter and became an accomplished pianist and violinist. As a young girl Barker performed with both Louis Spohr and Paganini. She began composing in the mid-1830s - her Seven Romances for voice and guitar were published in 1837. From around 1843 until 1855 she taught music at York School for the Blind. During this period some of her compositions - including a symphony in manuscript, on 19 April 1845 - were performed at York Choral Society concerts.

On 19 June 1855 she married the English dramatist, critic, biographer, public servant, and editor of Punch magazine Tom Taylor. Barker contributed music to at least one of her husband's plays, an overture and entr'acte to Joan of Arc (1871), and provided harmonisations as an appendix to his translation of Ballads and Songs of Brittany (1865).

Her other works include the cantata Enone (1850), the violin sonata A Country Walk (1860), theatre music for As You Like It, (April 1880), Songs of Youth (1884), string quartets, madrigals and solo songs. Her choral setting of Keats's A Prophecy, composed in 1850, was performed for the first time 49 years later at the Hovingham Festival in 1899. The composer was present.

Several of Barker's paintings hang at Smallhythe Place in Kent, Ellen Terry's house.

Personal life
Barker lived with her husband and family at 84 Lavender Sweep, Battersea. There were two children: the artist John Wycliffe Taylor (1859 - 1925), and Laura Lucy Arnold Taylor (1863 - 1940). The Sunday musical soirees at the house attracted many well-known attendees, including Lewis Carroll, Charles Dickens, Henry Irving, Charles Reade, Alfred Tennyson, Ellen Terry and William Makepeace Thackeray.

Tom Taylor died suddenly at his home in 1880 at the age of 62. After his death, his widow retired to Porch House, Coleshill in Buckinghamshire, where she died on 22 May 1905.

References

External links
 'Laura Wilson Barker, Mrs Tom Taylor and her son John Wycliffe Taylor', National Trust Collection
 [https://sheelanagigcomedienne.wordpress.com/tag/mr-and-mrs-tom-taylors-sunday-musiccal-soirees/ Jeanne Rathbone. Laura Barker 1819-1905 composer]
 'The Tie of Golden Thread', music supplement from The Girl's Own Paper (1882)

1819 births
English classical pianists
British classical pianists
Women classical pianists
English classical composers
Alumni of the Royal Academy of Music
British women classical composers
19th-century classical composers
Women of the Victorian era
19th-century English women artists
19th-century women composers
British women composers
1905 deaths